Aquastat is a device used in hydronic heating systems.

Aquastat may refer to:

 Aquastat, a database of global water usage maintained by the United Nations Food and Agriculture Organization

See also
 Aquastar (watch brand)
 Aquastax, a mobile game